The 1991 Volvo Women's Open was a women's tennis tournament played on outdoor hard courts at the Dusit Resort Hotel in Pattaya City in Thailand that was part of Tier V of the 1991 WTA Tour. It was the inaugural edition of the tournament and was held from 15 April through 21 April 1991. Unseeded Yayuk Basuki won the singles title and earned $13,500 first-prize money.

Finals

Singles

 Yayuk Basuki defeated  Naoko Sawamatsu 6–2, 6–2
 It was Basuki's first singles title of her career.

Doubles

 Nana Miyagi /  Suzanna Wibowo defeated  Rika Hiraki /  Akemi Nishiya 6–1, 6–4

References

External links
 ITF tournament edition details
 Tournament draws